Taylor Hudnall Stukes was an associate justice and chief justice on the South Carolina Supreme Court.

Life
He was born in Manning, South Carolina attended Davidson College; Washington and Lee University (LL.B., cum laude, 1919); and Erskine College (LL.D., 1969). He served as a lieutenant in World War I and practiced law in Manning, South Carolina. He served in the state House of Representatives from 1923 to 1926 and in the state Senate from 1927 to 1940. He was elected associate justice of the South Carolina Supreme Court on February 29, 1940, and chief justice in 1956 upon the resignation of Chief Justice D. Gordon Baker. He died on February 20, 1961, as a result of complications from heart surgery.

References

Chief Justices of the South Carolina Supreme Court
Justices of the South Carolina Supreme Court
1893 births
People from Manning, South Carolina
1961 deaths
Place of death missing
20th-century American judges